The first VIP series of La Venganza de los Ex will begin airing on 9 November 2021. It is the second series of the show overall.

The filming of the program took place in August and September 2021 in Colombia during the COVID-19 pandemic, for which the cast had to remain in quarantine for ten days before entering, however the production was not affected due to that the format originally kept cast members without outside access.

After filming the show, Kimberly Shanta and Roberto Mora competed on the second season of the MTV competition show Resistiré. Kelly Medanie joins the ninth season of Acapulco Shore. Michelle Lando returned for the show's third season, again in the role of the ex.

Cast 
The official list of cast members was confirmed with a promotion and includes four five singles: Brandon Castañeda, Camilo Pulgarin, Esteban Martínez, Ian García, and Roberto Mor; as well as five single women: Aylin Criss, Daphne Monasterios, Frida Urbina, Kelly Medan and Kimberly Shantal.

All the bachelors arrived at the villa during the first episode and immediately the Tablet of Terror announced the arrival of their exes, shortly after Diana Zambrano, Ian's ex-girlfriend arrived at the beach, however this is also Brandon and Robert's ex. El Suavecito and Karen Saldaña arrived at the villa in the second episode, being the ex-boyfriends of Kimberly and Kelly respectively. During the third episode, Camilo's ex, David Segura, came to the villa. Michelle Lando and Ricky Arenal, Aylin's ex, arrived at the beach simultaneously in the fifth episode. In the sixth episode, Daniel Fraga, Frida's ex-boyfriend, arrives at the villa. Andrés Restrepo, Camilo's ex, arrived at the beach in the seventh episode. During the eighth episode, Daniel's ex, Mariana Ayala, arrived at the villa. The Brazilian Carolina de Lima came to the beach during the ninth episode as Esteban's ex. Daphne was expelled in the tenth episode for her aggressive behavior, then Ian's ex Juanita Alvis arrived at the village while he and Kim went on a date. The last ex to arrive at the villa was Helian Evans, Mariana's ex.

 Bold indicates original cast member; all other cast were brought into the series as an ex.

Duration of cast 

 Key:  = "Cast member" is featured in this episode
 Key:  = "Cast member" arrives on the beach
 Key:  = "Cast member" has an ex arrive on the beach
 Key:  = "Cast member" has two exes arrive on the beach
 Key:  = "Cast member" arrives on the beach and has an ex arrive during the same episode
 Key:  = "Cast member" leaves the beach
 Key:  = "Cast member" does not feature in this episode

Episodes

Notes

References 

MTV original programming
Mexican reality television series
Ex on the Beach
Television shows filmed in Colombia